Pekurár is a Hungarian name, derived from Latin pecurarius, from pecoris, "flock", a derivation of pecus, "sheep". It is a cognate of the standard Italian word for shepherd "pecoraio", as well as a Romanian word for shepherd "păcurar".

See also 
 Păcurar, Păcuraru, Păcurariu
 Pecoraro (disambiguation)

References 

Hungarian-language surnames
Occupational surnames